Zhao Kai Pang (born March 5, 1995) is a Canadian former competitive ice dancer. With partner Madeline Edwards, he is the 2014 World Junior bronze medalist and 2013 Canadian national junior champion.

Career 
Zhao Kai Pang teamed up with Madeline Edwards in December 2007. They debuted on the ISU Junior Grand Prix series in 2011, placing fifth in Austria. The following season, they won a pair of bronze medals at their JGP assignments, in France and Turkey, and gold in the junior event at the 2013 Canadian Championships. They were sent to the 2013 World Junior Championships, where they finished 12th.

In the 2013–14 season, Edwards/Pang won two JGP medals, silver in Mexico and bronze in the Czech Republic. Because Skate Canada required junior champions to move up, they competed on the senior level domestically, with a different pattern in the short dance and an additional 30 seconds in the free dance. They finished seventh at the 2014 Canadian Championships. At the 2014 World Junior Championships, they won the bronze medal after placing fifth in the short dance and third in the free dance.

Edwards/Pang decided to continue competing on the JGP series in the 2014–15 season. They were awarded silver in Courchevel, France, finishing second to Russia's Alla Loboda / Pavel Drozd by a margin of 2.82 points. After edging Loboda/Drozd by 0.44 to win gold in Aichi, Japan, they qualified for the JGP Final in Barcelona, where they placed fifth. Edwards injured her ankle during training in late December 2014. Ranked sixth in the short and fourth in the free dance, the duo finished sixth at the 2015 World Junior Championships in Tallinn, Estonia.

Edwards/Pang decided to sit out the 2015–16 season to allow her ankle to heal fully. On July 13, 2016, Pang announced his decision to retire from competition.

In 2019, Pang was accepted into the University of British Columbia's Faculty of Medicine.

Programs 
(with Edwards)

Competitive highlights 
JGP: Junior Grand Prix

With Edwards

References

External links 

 
 

1995 births
Canadian male ice dancers
Living people
People from Kitimat
World Junior Figure Skating Championships medalists
21st-century Canadian people